Woolly bear may refer to:
The hairy caterpillar of any of the moth subfamily Arctiinae
The hairy caterpillar of the banded woolly bear (Pyrrharctia isabella)
The hairy caterpillar of the Arctic woolly bear moth (Gynaephora groenlandica)
The hairy caterpillar of the spotted tussock moth (Lophocampa maculata)
The larva of the varied carpet beetle
An episode of Thomas the Tank Engine and Friends
A type of thermal undersuit worn under a dry suit

Animal common name disambiguation pages